Events from the year 1990 in art.

Events
18 March – Isabella Stewart Gardner Museum theft: Twelve paintings, collectively worth from $100 to $300 million, are stolen from the Isabella Stewart Gardner Museum in Boston, Massachusetts by two thieves posing as police officers. This is the largest art theft in United States history and the largest-value theft of private property in world history, and the paintings have not been recovered.
6 April – Robert Mapplethorpe's "The Perfect Moment" show of nude and homosexual photographs opens at the Cincinnati Contemporary Art Centre, in spite of accusations of indecency by Citizens for Community Values.
15 May – Portrait of Doctor Gachet by Vincent van Gogh is sold for a record $82.5 million.
East Side Gallery, 105 paintings by 129 artists from 20 countries, is painted on the east side of the Berlin Wall in Germany following its abandonment. It includes Dmitri Vrubel's My God, Help Me to Survive This Deadly Love and Birgit Kinder's Test the Best (renamed Test the Rest after restoration).
John Keane is commissioned by the British Imperial War Museum as an official war artist in the Gulf War.

Exhibitions
British Art Show at Hayward Gallery includes work by Young British Artists
Jim Gary's Twentieth Century Dinosaurs opened on April 12, 1990, the only solo exhibition by a sculptor at the Smithsonian Institution's National Museum of Natural History in Washington, D.C., that drew a record number of visitors to the museum

Works

 Eduardo Chillida - Peine Del Viento XVII –
 Robert Coburn - Bell Circles II (sound installation, Portland, Oregon) – 
 Elisabeth Frink - Desert Quartet (sculpture, Worthing, England) –
 Douglas Gordon - Meaning and Location
 Damien Hirst - A Thousand Years
 Tadeusz Kantor - September Defeat 
 Lee Kelly with Michael Stirling - Friendship Circle (installation, Portland, Oregon) – 
 Eric Larsen - Packy mural (Portland, Oregon) – 
 Patrick Morelli - Behold (statue, Atlanta, Georgia) – 
 Victor Salmones - Cancer, There Is Hope (bronze, Houston, Texas)
Rachel Whiteread - Ghost – 
 Sue Williamson - For Thirty Years Next to His Heart (Forty-nine photocopies in artist-designed frames)

Awards
Turner Prize – No prize was offered because of lack of sponsorship.

Films
Vincent and Me

Deaths

January–June
January – Daniel du Janerand, French painter (b. 1919)
15 January - Henrietta Berk, 81. American painter (b. 1919)
22 January – Roman Vishniac, Russian-American photographer (b. 1897)
15 February – Norman Parkinson, English fashion photographer (b. 1913)
16 February – Keith Haring, American artist and social activist (b. 1958)
15 March – Jim Ede, English art collector (b. 1895)
21 April – Romain de Tirtoff, Russian-born French artist and designer (b. 1892)
May – Fuller Potter, American Abstract expressionist artist (b. 1910)
30 June – Jacques Lob, French comic book creator (b. 1932)

July–December
18 July – Yves Chaland, French cartoonist (b. 1957)
23 July – Pierre Gandon, French illustrator and engraver of postage stamps (b. 1899)
25 July – Leonard Bahr, American portrait and mural painter (b. 1905)
14 October – Clifton Pugh, Australian artist (b. 1924)
26 October – Joan Brown, American figurative painter (b. 1938)
7 December – Jean Paul Lemieux, Canadian-American painter (b. 1904) 
8 December – Tadeusz Kantor, Polish painter, assemblage artist, set designer and theatre director (b. 1915)
23 December – Serge Danot, French animator (b. 1931)
28 December – Ed van der Elsken, Dutch photographer (b. 1925)
29 December – David Piper, English curator and novelist (b. 1918)

See also 
 1990 in fine arts of the Soviet Union

References

 
Years of the 20th century in art
1990s in art